Heritage Colleges Australia is a group of five Christadelphian schools in Australia situated in Sydney, Cooranbong, Adelaide, Perth and Melbourne.

The name "Heritage College" comes from the Bible passage "Behold, children are a heritage from the Lord, the fruit of the womb a reward" (Psalm 127:3) and is indicative of the Colleges' belief that parents and guardians are 'caretakers of the precious children that God has 'lent' them', which is the motivation behind the Heritage Colleges' aim to 'assist [parents] in raising and saving these children for Christ and his coming Kingdom on Earth'.

There are other Christadelphian schools around the world in, for example, Ontario (Canada), and California (USA).

See also

 Heritage College Sydney
 Heritage College Lake Macquarie
 Heritage College Adelaide
 Heritage College Perth
 Heritage College, Melbourne (Heritage College Knox)

References

External links
 Heritage Colleges Australia
 [http://www.heritage.vic.edu.au

 
Christadelphian organizations